The West Indies women's cricket team toured Sri Lanka in November 2008. They played against Sri Lanka in 5 One Day Internationals, losing the series 3–2. The tour was originally planned to be a tour of both Sri Lanka and Pakistan, but the side cancelled the Pakistan leg of the tour due to security concerns.

Squads

Tour Match: Sri Lanka XI v West Indies

WODI Series

1st ODI

2nd ODI

3rd ODI

4th ODI

5th ODI

References

External links
West Indies Women tour of Sri Lanka 2008/09 from Cricinfo

International cricket competitions in 2008
2008 in women's cricket
Women's international cricket tours of Sri Lanka
West Indies women's cricket team tours